is a passenger railway station in located in the city of  Wakayama, Wakayama Prefecture, Japan, operated by the private railway company Wakayama Electric Railway.

Lines
Kamayama Station is served by the Kishigawa Line, and is located 3.7 kilometers from the terminus of the line at Wakayama Station.

Station layout
The station consists of one island platform with a level crossing. There is no station building and the station is unattended.

Adjacent stations

History
Kamayama Station opened on February 15, 1916.

Passenger statistics

Surrounding Area
Kamayama Shrine

See also
List of railway stations in Japan

References

External links
 
  Kamayama Station timetable

Railway stations in Japan opened in 1916
Railway stations in Wakayama Prefecture
Wakayama (city)